The 2020–21 K.A.A. Gent season was the club's 118th season in existence and the 32nd consecutive season in the top flight of Belgian football. In addition to the domestic league, Gent participated in this season's editions of the Belgian Cup, the UEFA Champions League, and the UEFA Europa League. The season covered the period from 1 July 2020 to 30 June 2021.

Players

First-team squad

Out on loan

Transfers

In

Out

Pre-season and friendlies

Competitions

Overview

Belgian First Division A

Regular season

Results summary

Results by round

Matches
The league fixtures were announced on 8 July 2020.

Play-Off II

Results summary

Results by round

Matches

Belgian Cup

UEFA Champions League

Qualifying rounds

UEFA Europa League

Group stage

The group stage draw was held on 2 October 2020.

Statistics

Squad appearances and goals
Last updated on 22 May 2021.

|-
! colspan=14 style=background:#dcdcdc; text-align:center|Goalkeepers

|-
! colspan=14 style=background:#dcdcdc; text-align:center|Defenders

|-
! colspan=14 style=background:#dcdcdc; text-align:center|Midfielders

|-
! colspan=14 style=background:#dcdcdc; text-align:center|Forwards

|-
! colspan=14 style=background:#dcdcdc; text-align:center|Players who have made an appearance this season but have left the club

|}

Goalscorers

References

External links

K.A.A. Gent seasons
Gent
Gent
2020–21 UEFA Europa League participants seasons